Xylophaga dorsalis is a species of bivalves in the family Xylophagaidae.

See also 
 List of marine molluscs of Ireland (Bivalvia)

References 

 Purchon, R. D. 1941. On the biology and relationships of the lamellibranch Xylophaga dorsalis (Turton). Marine Biological Association of the United Kingdom, Journal 25(1): 1–39.

External links 
 
 Xylophaga dorsalis at WoRMS

Pholadidae
Bivalves described in 1819
Fauna of Ireland